The Trans-Harbour line is the link Harbour line of the Mumbai Suburban Railway connects between Navi Mumbai and Thane Operates by Central Railway.

This line is also a double line and therefore doesn't have any fast trains on it. Starts from separate platforms lie at the far east in  runs parallel with Central Railway line with crossing over Thane creek until just before the Parsik Tunnel where the line turns downwards and runs until . At , the line branches into two and both are runs parallel with Harbour line. The first line joins at Sanpada and terminates at Vashi. Whereas the second line joints at Juinagar and terminates at Panvel.

The stations of the Trans-Harbour line on the Navi Mumbai side are also well maintained and beautifully designed by CIDCO. Some of the IT, Corporate & commercial office along with Shopping Malls are also above the stations which lie on this route.

As of January 2020, After launching AC local on this route there are 262 services operating on the Trans-Harbour line, of which 248 are 12-car Non-AC local services and 16 are 12-car AC local services.

History
The City and Industrial Development Corporation of Maharashtra (CIDCO) was appointed as a New Town Development Authority in 1970. The government acquired land from 95 villages and handed over to CIDCO for the development of towns. To decongest the mother city, Mumbai, CIDCO developed 14 nodes in Navi Mumbai. The development of Navi Mumbai International Airport and 6 railway corridors in Navi Mumbai were meant for increasing connectivity between the towns, nodes and mega establishments. The major features of the rail corridor are direct access from residential to railway station by foot, convenient interchange facility from one corridor to another, double discharge platforms at every station, easy to follow routes and comfortable and pleasant journeys form the key features of the commuter railway system in Navi Mumbai.

The line was freight-only from 1993 until 2004, when passenger service began. It was formally inaugurated on 9 November 2004 by Railway Minister Laloo Prasad Yadav.

On 19 January 2013, the conversion was completed of all ten rakes on the Trans-Harbour line into 12-car trains.

Stations

See also
 Mumbai Suburban Railway
 List of Mumbai Suburban Railway stations
 Nerul–Uran line (Mumbai Suburban Railway)
 Central line (Mumbai Suburban Railway)

References

Transport in Thane
Transport in Navi Mumbai
Transport in Thane district
Mumbai Suburban Railway lines
Railway lines opened in 1993
Rail transport in Mumbai
1993 establishments in Maharashtra